Trypantius is a genus of beetles in the family Buprestidae, containing the following species:

 Trypantius bitaeniatus (Chevrolat, 1835)
 Trypantius brasiliensis Obenberger, 1924
 Trypantius infrequens Waterhouse, 1887

References

Buprestidae genera